NGC 330 is an open cluster in the Small Magellanic Cloud. It is located in the constellation Tucana. It was discovered on 1 August, 1826 by James Dunlop. It was described by Dreyer as "a globular cluster, very bright, small, a little extended, stars from 13th to 15th magnitude." At an aperture of 31.0 arcseconds, the apparent V-band magnitude is 9.60, but at this wavelength, it also has 0.36 magnitudes of interstellar extinction.

NGC 330 is quite young, at about 40 million years old, and has a large proportion of Be stars. All else equal, older star clusters have higher mass-to-luminosity ratios; that is, they have lower luminosities for the same mass. About 34% of the massive star population in NGC 330 is estimated to be in a close binary star system; this is lower than clusters in the Large Magellanic Cloud and the Milky Way, but it is unknown if this is because NGC 330 is metal-poor or is older than the compared clusters.

References

External links
 

0330
18260801
Tucana (constellation)
Small Magellanic Cloud
Discoveries by James Dunlop
Open clusters